Pseudorbis granulum is a species of sea snail, a marine gastropod mollusk in the family Skeneidae.

Description
The size of the shell varies between 0.8 mm and 1.5 mm. The shell is scarcely unibilicated. The aperture is circular. The surface is spirally costate, not cancellated.

Distribution
This marine species is found in the Mediterranean Sea, originally off Sicily and recently off the Alboran Island.

References

 Rubio F. & Rodriguez Babio C. (1991 ["1990"]) Sobre la posición sistemática de Pseudorbis granulum Brugnone, 1873 (Mollusca, Archeogastropoda, Skeneidae) y descripción de Pseudorbis jameoensis n. sp., procedente de las Islas Canarias. Iberus 9(1–2): 203–207
 Gofas, S.; Le Renard, J.; Bouchet, P. (2001). Mollusca, in: Costello, M.J. et al. (Ed.) (2001). European register of marine species: a check-list of the marine species in Europe and a bibliography of guides to their identification. Collection Patrimoines Naturels, 50: pp. 180–213

External links
 

granulum
Gastropods described in 1873